Geno's Steaks is a Philadelphia restaurant specializing in cheesesteaks, founded in 1966 by Joey Vento. Geno's is located in South Philadelphia at the intersection of 9th Street and Passyunk Avenue, directly across the street from rival Pat's King of Steaks, which is generally credited with having invented the cheesesteak in 1933. The cheesesteak has since become a signature dish for the city of Philadelphia. After Joey Vento's death in 2011, restaurant ownership was passed to his son Geno Vento.

History
Owner Joey Vento started a small grill venue at 9th and Passyunk in 1966 and over time his business gained praise from locals. Joey had a son in 1971 and named him Geno, who from 17 on, worked in his father's business.

According to Vento, the name 'Geno's' was chosen because 'Joe's Steak Place' was already in business. He improvised the name from a broken door on which someone had painted 'GINO' and modified the spelling to prevent confusion with a regional fast food chain called Gino's. Vento later named his own son Geno, who now is in charge of the family business.

Geno's was awarded Best of Philly for Best Takeout by Philadelphia Magazine in 2000. In April 2004, a branch of the shop opened in Citizens Bank Park, the home of the Philadelphia Phillies. This location was closed in 2006 and replaced with Rick's Steaks (operated by Rick Olivieri, grandson of Pat Olivieri, founder of Pat's King of Steaks). 

On August 23, 2011, 71-year-old owner and founder Joey Vento died of a heart attack.

Geno's Steaks has branch locations at Terminal B of Philadelphia International Airport and at Rivers Casino Philadelphia. On September 20, 2015, Geno's Steaks opened a location at Xfinity Live! Philadelphia.

Description

Geno's menu is very similar to that of Pat's. Geno's does not chop the meat while Pat's does. Geno's claims to have sold up to 4,500 sandwiches daily.

The walls, roof, and interior of Geno's are decorated with memorabilia and hundreds of autographed and framed photos of celebrities who have eaten there.

English sign controversy

A sign on Geno's window gained press notoriety in 2006, during the immigration controversy. The sign reads: "This Is AMERICA: WHEN ORDERING Please "SPEAK ENGLISH"." The Philadelphia Commission on Human Relations filed a discrimination complaint, arguing that Geno's violated the city's Fair Practices Ordinance, which prohibits discrimination in public accommodation, by "denying service to someone because of his or her national origin, and having printed material making certain groups of people feel their patronage is unwelcome." Vento had previously said the signs are directed at the Mexican immigrants in the surrounding neighborhood.

Vento said that no one has been refused service for not speaking English, but said, "If I can't understand you, you might not get the sandwich you thought you ordered."

The Philadelphia Commission on Human Relations found probable cause that the sign is discriminatory. The commission says the sign could make non-English speakers feel unwelcome or discriminated against.

Vento enlisted the aid of the Southeastern Legal Foundation, a public-interest legal organization. In 2006, the Foundation had defended a bar owner cited by the Ohio Civil Rights Commission for a sign reading "For Service, Speak English." That case was settled when the owner removed the sign.

Responding in an interview with Fox News analyst Neil Cavuto, Vento stated that he does not turn away any customer, and therefore does not discriminate. He also vowed to keep his sign displayed no matter how much pressure he receives. He explained to Cavuto that his parents had to learn English when they came to the U.S. He said that if his customers order in any other language, he will give them Cheez Whiz on bread. Vento posed some rhetorical questions: "If one goes into a Puerto Rican neighborhood, how many signs would be seen in English?" and "When one is on the telephone, it may say press 1 for English, press 2 for Spanish; but where is the number for, say, Italian or Korean?"

On March 19, 2008, Philadelphia's Commission on Human Relations ruled that the restaurant did not violate the city's Fair Practices Ordinance.

The sign was quietly removed at some point before the 2016 Democratic National Convention to avoid offense.

See also
Italian Market (Philadelphia)
History of the Italian Americans in Philadelphia

References

External links
Geno's steaks website
Whitford, David. "DRINKS WITH: FRANK OLIVIERI AND JOE VENTO Sandwich Superheroes" (Archive). Fortune. Thursday, May 29, 2003.

Restaurants established in 1966
Submarine sandwich restaurants
Restaurants in Philadelphia
1966 establishments in Pennsylvania
Passyunk Square, Philadelphia